Perry James Moore III (December 21, 1927 - May 19, 2017) was an American politician in the state of Montana. He served in the Montana Senate and was its minority leader from 1973 to 1974. Moore attended Montana State University and is an author, rancher and lawyer.

References

1927 births
2017 deaths
People from Lewistown, Montana
Montana State University alumni
Ranchers from Montana
Writers from Montana
Montana lawyers
Republican Party Montana state senators